Gareth Hugh Roderick (born 29 August 1991) is an English-South African cricketer who plays for Worcestershire County Cricket Club.

He is a right-handed batsman who also plays as a wicket-keeper. Roderick made his first-class debut for KwaZulu-Natal against Free State on 24 March 2011.

Roderick was spotted by Gloucestershire whilst playing league cricket for Cheltenham Cricket Club in the West of England Premier League. He subsequently signed a two-year contract with Gloucestershire in the autumn of 2012, having qualified as a non-overseas player due to having an English mother. He originally came over to England in 2010 playing for Old Cricket Club where he broke the league record for the Northants Cricket League. He also broke the league club record for the highest score. After a successful first county season, where he averaged 44.33 and scored over 600 runs, he signed a contract extension until 2016.

Ahead of the 2021 county season, Roderick joined Worcestershire on a three-year contract.

References

External links
 
 
 Gareth Roderick at Gloucestershire CCC

1991 births
Living people
Cricketers from Durban
English cricketers
Gloucestershire cricket captains
Gloucestershire cricketers
KwaZulu-Natal cricketers
South African cricketers
Worcestershire cricketers
South African emigrants to the United Kingdom
Wicket-keepers